WNTX is a News/Talk/Sports formatted broadcast radio station licensed to Fredericksburg, Virginia, serving metro Fredericksburg.  WNTX is owned and operated by Alpha Media LLC, through licensee Alpha Media Licensee LLC.

History
It was known as WFLS and simulcast with WFLS-FM until 1996, when the calls were changed to WYSK and it started simulcasting WYSK-FM.

On July 5, 2011, WYSK began carrying Glenn Beck, Rush Limbaugh and Sean Hannity talk shows during the day.  On July 15, 2011, WYSK changed their call letters to WNTX.

On January 23, 2015, Alpha Media "entered into a definitive agreement" to purchase WNTX and sister stations WFLS-FM, WVBX, and WWUZ from Free Lance-Star License, Inc. for an unknown sum. The purchase was consummated on May 1, 2015, at a price of $8.1 million.

Translator
In February 2010, WYSK began simulcasting on FM translator W243BS at 96.5 FM.  On April 16, 2013, W243BS 96.5 dropped its simulcast of sister station WNTX for a simulcast of WFLS-HD2 carrying a Freeform format.  The "FredFM" format was dropped in early March 2014, when W243BS resumed simulcasting sister station WNTX.

References

External links
News Talk Sports Radio 1350 AM & 96.5 FM Online

NTX
Sports radio stations in the United States
News and talk radio stations in the United States
Radio stations established in 1960
ESPN Radio stations
Alpha Media radio stations